

Players

Competitions

Division Four

League table

Results summary

League position by match

Matches

FA Cup

League Cup

Appearances and goals

Notes

References

Books

1970-71
Northampton Town